Mark Cornell (born 5 May 1939) is a South African cricketer. He played in seven first-class matches for Border in 1959/60 and 1960/61.

See also
 List of Border representative cricketers

References

External links
 

1939 births
Living people
South African cricketers
Border cricketers